Müller Ltd. & Co. KG (Müller) is a chain of retail stores with headquarters in Ulm, Germany. Between 2004 and 2019 the company was registered in London. Since 2019 it has been registered in Vaduz, Liechtenstein.

History 
The hairdresser  founded his company in Ulm on 5 March 1953. By 1968 the company had opened additional outlets in Munich and Karlsruhe. In 1976 the construction of a corporate headquarters began in Ulm-Jungingen. In 1978 annual revenue crossed 100 million D-Mark for the first time. From 1980 to 1985 the company opened 59 new outlets, was converted into the  Müller GmbH & Co. KG in 1985 and then opened another 86 outlets by 1990. Since then the company has expanded in Europe.

Müller has more than 34,000 employees. In 2010 the company earned revenues of 2.42 billion Euro. Erwin Müller and Elke Menold are General Managers of the company.

In 2004, the company was transformed into a Limited & Co. KG (a hybrid of the English cognate of the German GmbH and the German word "Compagnie Kommanditgesellschaft", meaning "limited partnership") when the company registered under English law in London.

Müller in Europe
By October 2017 Müller had a total of 814 outlets in 6 European countries:

Products 
Müller is primarily a cosmetics store with large drugstore (approx. 50 000 items) and perfumery (approx. 28 000 items) section, but apart from beauty care products it also sells commodities and fashion accessories, health food and dietary supplements, as well as some over-the-counter drugs, household products, toys, multi-media (i.e. movies on DVD as well as music CDs), stationery and books. Its portfolio consists of approx. 188 000 products total.

Unlike competing chains such as dm-drogerie markt, Müller mostly sells products directly from the German domestic market (in a manner similar to parallel importing) in all countries where it operates. Because of this, many Croats go to Müller to shop for cosmetics, detergents and most-famously, Nutella as the one offered in other retail stores is of lower quality.

Controversy
Müller ban employees from wearing Hijab and went to European Court of Justice in Luxemburg to ban two women from working in its store for wearing Hijab. Many joined a campaign to boycott it.

See also
dm-drogerie markt
Rossmann
Douglas

References

External links

 Müller Austria
 Müller Croatia
 Müller Germany
 Müller Hungary
 Müller Slovenia
 Müller Spain
 Müller Switzerland

Department stores of Germany
Retail companies established in 1953
Retail companies of Germany
Beauty stores